Chelodina kurrichalpongo, also known as the Darwin snake-necked turtle, is a species of snake-necked turtle that is endemic to Australia. The specific epithet kurrichalpongo refers to the Aboriginal Dreamtime creation myth of the black rock-snake that laid the eggs from which hatched the rainbow snakes that carved the depressions and watercourses in the landscape. The name alludes to the snake-like neck of the turtle, the varied colour-phases of different individuals, and to the rivers and billabongs it inhabits.

Distribution
The species occurs in the tropical Top End of the Northern Territory. The type locality is McMinns Lagoon on the outskirts of Darwin.

References

 
kurrichalpongo
Turtles of Australia
Reptiles of the Northern Territory
Reptiles described in 2019